The 1942 Tavistock by-election was held on 2 April 1942.  The by-election was held due to the death of the incumbent Conservative MP, Mark Patrick.  It was won by the Conservative candidate Henry Studholme, who was unopposed due to the War-time electoral pact.

References

1942 in England
1942 elections in the United Kingdom
By-elections to the Parliament of the United Kingdom in Devon constituencies
1940s in Devon